The Jameh Mosque of Gonabad is related to Khwarazmian dynasty and is located in Gonabad.

References

Mosques in Iran
Mosque buildings with domes
National works of Iran
Gonabad